Georg Macco (23 March 1863, Aachen - 20 April 1933, Genoa) was a German landscape painter and illustrator, associated with the Düsseldorfer Malerschule. He is primarily known for his Orientalist works.

Biography 
He was inspired by stories of his great-great-uncle, the history and portrait painter , who painted a portrait of the Queen of Prussia and was a close friend of Beethoven and Goethe. His artistic career began at the Kunstakademie Düsseldorf in 188o, where he studied with Eugen Dücker and Johann Peter Theodor Janssen until 1887. During this time, he also contributed illustrations to Die Gartenlaube and drawings of coats-of-arms for his brother, who was an historian and genealogist.

He moved to Munich to further his studies and used that city as a base for his numerous travels, beginning with mountainous regions from Italy to Spitsbergen. Later, he travelled throughout the Mediterranean region, visiting such then-exotic locations as Istanbul, Baalbek, Jerusalem, Cairo and the vicinity of Mecca. The works he produced as a result of these travels would eventually become his most popular and sought after.

Some of his works in Aachen were previously on the "Schattengalerie" (shadow gallery) list of works looted by the Nazis during World War II. Other works, not yet displayed, have been uncovered at the Simferopol Art Museum.

Sources 
 Benezit Dictionary of Artists, 1999, Vol.8, pg.910
 
 Albrecht Macco: Das Geschlecht Macco, Frühgeschichte, Löwensteiner Linie, Weikersheimer Linie, Kurzübersicht, Self-published, Cologne, 1940.

External links 

 More works by Macco @ ArtNet

1863 births
1933 deaths
19th-century German painters
19th-century German male artists
German landscape painters
Orientalist painters
Kunstakademie Düsseldorf alumni
People from Aachen
20th-century German painters
20th-century German male artists